Pleasant Run Methodist Church is a historic church in Russellville, Kentucky.  It was built in a Gothic Revival style and added to the National Register of Historic Places in 1982.

It was built before an 1877 atlas documented its existence.  The original Pleasant Run Methodist Church, built c.1808-13, was demolished before 1877.  It has a two-stage central entrance tower.

References

Methodist churches in Kentucky
Carpenter Gothic church buildings in Kentucky
Churches in Logan County, Kentucky
Churches on the National Register of Historic Places in Kentucky
National Register of Historic Places in Logan County, Kentucky